Wasp Flight Systems (often called just Wasp Systems) is a British aircraft manufacturer based in Kendal, Cumbria and run by Chris Taylor. The company specializes in the design and manufacture of powered hang gliders in the form of ready-to-fly motorized harnesses for the US FAR 103 Ultralight Vehicles rules and the European microlight category.

The company was founded in 1998.

The company's sole product is the Wasp SP, a powered hang glider unit. This has gone through several generations of development, including the Wasp SP Mk2, introduced in 2002 and the current production version, the Wasp SP Mk4.

Aircraft

References

External links

Aircraft manufacturers of the United Kingdom
Ultralight aircraft
Powered hang gliders